"Nova Methodus pro Maximis et Minimis" is the first published work on the subject of calculus. It was published by Gottfried Leibniz in the Acta Eruditorum in October 1684. It is considered to be the birth of infinitesimal calculus.

Full title
The full title of the published work is "Nova methodus pro maximis et minimis, itemque tangentibus, quae nec fractas nec irrationales quantitates moratur, et singulare pro illis calculi genus." In English, the full title can be translated as "A new method for maxima and minima, and for tangents, that is not hindered by fractional or irrational quantities, and a singular kind of calculus for the above mentioned." It is from this title that this branch of mathematics takes the name calculus.

Influence
Although calculus was independently co-invented by Isaac Newton, most of the notation in modern calculus is from Leibniz. Leibniz's careful attention to his notation makes some believe that "his contribution to calculus was much more influential than Newton's."

See also
 Leibniz–Newton calculus controversy

References

External links
 Mathematical Treasure: Leibniz's Papers on Calculus: "Nova Methodus pro Maximis et Minimis..." (Latin original)
 English translation

Mathematics papers
Calculus
Works by Gottfried Wilhelm Leibniz
Latin texts